Inhibitor of nuclear factor kappa-B kinase subunit epsilon also known as I-kappa-B kinase epsilon or  IKK-epsilon is an enzyme that in humans is encoded by the IKBKE gene.

Interactions 
IKBKE has been shown to interact with TANK.

Function 
It is a Serine/threonine kinase that plays an essential role in regulating inflammatory responses to viral infection, through the activation of the type I IFN, NF-kappa-B and STAT signaling. Also involved in TNFA and inflammatory cytokines, like Interleukin-1, signaling. Following activation of viral RNA sensors, such as RIG-I-like receptors, associates with DDX3X and phosphorylates interferon regulatory factors (IRFs), IRF3 and IRF7, as well as DDX3X. This activity allows subsequent homodimerization and nuclear translocation of the IRF3 leading to transcriptional activation of pro-inflammatory and antiviral genes including IFNB. In order to establish such an antiviral state, IKBKE forms several different complexes whose composition depends on the type of cell and cellular stimuli. Thus, several scaffolding molecules including IPS1/MAVS, TANK, AZI2/NAP1 or TBKBP1/SINTBAD (TANK-binding kinase 1-binding protein 1) can be recruited to the IKBKE-containing-complexes. Activated by polyubiquitination in response to TNFA and interleukin-1, regulates the NF-kappa-B signaling pathway through, at least, the phosphorylation of CYLD. Phosphorylates inhibitors of NF-kappa-B thus leading to the dissociation of the inhibitor/NF-kappa-B complex and ultimately the degradation of the inhibitor. In addition, is also required for the induction of a subset of ISGs which displays antiviral activity, may be through the phosphorylation of STAT1 at 'Ser-708'. Phosphorylation of STAT1 at 'Ser-708' seems also to promote the assembly and DNA binding of ISGF3 (STAT1:STAT2:IRF9) complexes compared to GAF (gamma-activation factor) (STAT1:STAT1) complexes, in this way regulating the balance between type I and type II IFN responses. Protects cells against DNA damage-induced cell death. Also plays an important role in energy balance regulation by sustaining a state of chronic, low-grade inflammation in obesity, which leads to a negative impact on insulin sensitivity. Phosphorylates AKT1.

Clinical significance 
Inhibition of IκB kinase (IKK) and  IKK-related kinases, IKBKE (IKKε) and TANK-binding kinase 1 (TBK1), has been investigated as a therapeutic option for the treatment of inflammatory diseases and cancer.

References

Further reading

EC 2.7.11